The Slovene Writers' Association is a non-profit association of Slovene writers based in Ljubljana.

The association was founded on 21 April 1872 in Ljubljana at the initiative of Davorin Trstenjak who also became its first president. The statue of the organization was confirmed by the Duchy of Carniola on 10 May 1872. The constituent congress was held on 14 September 1872 while regular meetings took place in the Hotel Evropa until the 1885. It operated under various names over the years and re-adopted its original name Društvo slovenskih pisateljev in 1968. It provides a platform for writers, poets, playwrights and essayists who participate to promote common cultural and social inetersts.

The association has also made considerable efforts in promoting Slovene literature abroad. Its international activities include maintaining contacts with cultural institutions and writers' societies all around the world and collaborating with literary journals and magazines. Its own publication Litterae slovenicae (called  Le Livre Slovène before 1991) publishes excerpts, poems and short stories by Slovene writers in translation, making Slovene literature available to a world audience.

It annually bestows the Vilenica Prize to a Central European author for his or her achievements in the field of literature and essay writing at the festival which takes place in the Vilenica Cave in the Slovenian Littoral. Since 1986 it has also annually awarded the Jenko Award for the best poetry collection in Slovene published in the previous two years.

Presidents 
 Davorin Trstenjak 1872
 Rajko Perušek 1895–1915
 Anton Funtek
 Alojz Gradnik
 Oton Župančič
 France Koblar 1938–1945
 Miško Kranjec (2 terms) 
 France Bevk (2 terms) 
 Ivan Potrč (2 terms) 
 Mile Klopčič 
 Beno Zupančič 
 Matej Bor 1959–1961
 Anton Ingolič 
 Mira Mihelič
 Janez Menart
 Ciril Kosmač 
 Tone Pavček 1979–1983
 Tone Partljič 1983–1987
 Rudi Šeligo 1987–1991
 Dane Zajc 1991–1995
 Evald Flisar 1995–2001 (3 terms)
 Tone Peršak 2001–2003
 Vlado Žabot 2003–2007 (2 terms)
 Slavko Pregl 2007–2009
 Milan Jesih 2009–2011
 Veno Taufer 2011–2014
 Ivo Svetina 2014–

See also
 Association of Writers of Yugoslavia

References

Slovenian writers' organizations
1872 establishments in Austria-Hungary
Organizations established in 1872
Organizations based in Ljubljana